Douglass Haywood Rauch (September 14, 1950 – April 23, 1979) was an American bassist.

He played with Carlos Santana during his jazz fusion period in the early 1970s.

He also teamed up with David Bowie for his Diamond Dogs tour for a month in September 1974.

Discography
1969: Bunky & Jake: L.A.M.F.
1970: Buzzy Linhart: Music (later re-released as Buzzy Linhart is Music)
1971: Carly Simon: Carly Simon
1971: Papa John Creach: Papa John Creach
1971: Giants': Giants''' (recorded 1971, released 1978)
1972: Santana: Caravanserai1973: Betty Davis: Betty Davis1973: Bola Sete: Goin' To Rio1973: John McLaughlin & Carlos Santana:  Love Devotion Surrender1973: Santana: Welcome1974: Santana: Lotus1974: Jose Chepito Areas: Jose Chepito Areas1974: David Bowie: Cracked Actor (recorded 1974, released 2017)
1975: Shigeru Suzuki: Bandwagon1975: Cobham/Duke Band: Live at the Electric Ballroom (Dallas NYE 1975 live recording)
1976: Lenny White: Venusian Summer1976: Billy Cobham: Life & Times1976: Ike White: Changin' Times'' (recorded in Tehachapi State Prison)

References

1950 births
1979 deaths
Santana (band) members
American jazz bass guitarists
American male bass guitarists
American rock bass guitarists
Deaths by heroin overdose in California
20th-century American musicians
Guitarists from New York (state)
American male guitarists
Drug-related deaths in California
20th-century American guitarists
20th-century bass guitarists
American male jazz musicians
Little Red School House alumni
20th-century American male musicians
Jazz musicians from New York (state)